The Bridge Street Ferry was a ferry route connecting Manhattan and Williamsburg, Brooklyn, New York City, United States, joining James Slip (Manhattan) and Bridge Street (Brooklyn) across the East River.

History
The ferry was established by the Brooklyn Ferry Company on July 1, 1864, running over a similar route to the old Roosevelt Street Ferry, which ran to Bridge Street until 1859. The route was discontinued in early 1874, due to the failure of a bill to improve Bridge Street.

Today, the site of the Bridge Street Ferry Pier is within a Con Ed substation. The site of the James Slip Ferry Pier is in the Alfred E. Smith Houses a NYCHA housing complex next to the Brooklyn Bridge.

See also
List of ferries across the East River

References

East River
Ferries of New York City